Mateus dos Santos Castro (born 11 September 1994) is a Brazilian footballer who plays for Nagoya Grampus.

Career

Club
On 6 January 2019, Mateus signed for Nagoya Grampus.

Club statistics
Updated to 28 September 2022.

Honours

Club
Yokohama F. Marinos
J1 League: 2019
Nagoya Grampus
J.League Cup: 2021

References

External links

Profile at Nagoya Grampus
Profile at Omiya Ardija

1994 births
Living people
Brazilian footballers
Brazilian expatriate footballers
J1 League players
J2 League players
Esporte Clube Bahia players
Omiya Ardija players
Nagoya Grampus players
Yokohama F. Marinos players
Association football wingers
Brazilian expatriate sportspeople in Japan
Expatriate footballers in Japan